Florence Omagbemi (born 2 February 1975) is a Nigerian former football midfielder. She was part of the Nigeria women's national football team across four FIFA Women's World Cups, several Africa Women Cup of Nations and at the 2000 Summer Olympics. In 2016, she was named interim coach of the national side, having previously been an assistant coach to the Nigeria women's national under-20 football team.

International playing career
Omagbemi played for the Nigeria women's national football team for over a decade, appearing in four FIFA Women's World Cups including being a member of the team that reached the second round in 1999 before losing to Brazil.  As captain, she won the Africa Women Cup of Nations with the "Super Falcons" on four occasions in 1998, 2000, 2002 and 2004. She was also part of the Nigerian team which competed the Summer Olympics for the first time in the 2000 tournament in Australia.

Coaching career
Omagbemi began her coaching career with several American based youth teams, before being called up to be the assistant coach for the Nigeria women's national under-20 football team. While in that position, the team reached the semifinals of the 2012 FIFA U-20 Women's World Cup before being eliminated by the United States. Omagbemi was named as an interim coach of the senior national side for the 2016 Africa Women Cup of Nations. Nigeria had been without a coach since the sacking of Christopher Danjuma following a poor performance of the team at the 2015 African Games.

A month prior to the start of the tournament, it was revealed that Omagbemi had gone unpaid by the Nigeria Football Federation. In response, the NFF made assurances that she would be paid before the team departed for the tournament.

On 3 December 2016 Florence Omagbemi became the first woman to win the Africa Women Cup of Nations as both a player and coach.

Honours
Nigeria
As player
 African Women's Championship (4): 1998, 2000, 2002, 2004

As coach
 African Women's Championship winner: 2016

See also
 Nigeria at the 2000 Summer Olympics

Notes

References

External links
 http://pulse.ng/sports/football/florence-omagbemi-super-falcons-coach-loses-dad-id5849243.html
 http://www.goal.com/en-ng/news/7255/african-women-championship/2016/11/28/29937372/florence-omagbemi-is-a-very-good-coach-says-ngozi-okobi
 http://www.thisdaylive.com/index.php/2016/12/10/florence-omagbemi-her-crowning-glory/

1975 births
Living people
Nigerian women's footballers
Place of birth missing (living people)
Footballers at the 2000 Summer Olympics
Olympic footballers of Nigeria
Women's association football midfielders
1991 FIFA Women's World Cup players
Nigeria women's international footballers
1995 FIFA Women's World Cup players
1999 FIFA Women's World Cup players
2003 FIFA Women's World Cup players
Nigeria women's national football team managers
Nigerian football managers
Female association football managers
Sportspeople from Warri
Nigerian expatriate sportspeople in the United States
Expatriate women's soccer players in the United States
Women's United Soccer Association players
Boston Breakers (WUSA) players
San Diego Spirit players
Hampton Roads Piranhas players
Yoruba people
College women's soccer players in the United States